Kedington is a village and civil parish in the West Suffolk district of Suffolk in eastern England, located between the towns of Clare and Haverhill in the south-west of Suffolk.

History
Known as Kidituna in the Domesday Book (1086), there were 280 people living there at that time. Part of it was formerly in Essex. The puritan, Thomas Barnardiston studied under Calvin in Geneva during the reign of Queen Mary I, but returned to Kedington after the accession of Queen Elizabeth I in 1558 and the consequent Elizabethan Religious Settlement.

Church of St Peter and St Paul
Kedington's church, St Peter and St Paul, is one of the historical treasures of East Anglia, dating from the late 13th century. However, the church is built on top of a Roman villa, the remains of which can be viewed under small trap doors located in the pews towards the back of the nave. There is an Anglo-Saxon stone cross located above the altar on the east wall of the church. This was found near to the church and is believed to be from a church dating from Saxon times. Kedington comes in the top rank of small English churches and is renowned for its unmodernised interior and Barnardiston tombs. John Betjeman understandably christened Kedington ' a village Westminster Abbey'. 

The Anglican minister, Samuel Fairclough (1594-1677) was born nearby in Haverhill and was appointed rector in 1629. However in 1662, following the Archbishop of Canterburypassage of the Act of Uniformity, Fairclough was ejected for non-conformity and replaced by John Tillotson (1630-1694), who served in the role 1663-1664 and went on to become  Archbishop of Canterbury.

Notable residents
Samuel Fairclough (1594-1677), nonconformist divine and Rector of Kedington 1629-1662
John Tillotson, Archbishop of Canterbury from 1691 to 1694 and Rector of Kedington 1663-1664.
Philip Skippon (1641-1691), traveller, writer, diarist, landowner and Member of Parliament for Dunwich.
Peter Wildy (1920-1987), Virologist and Chair of Pathology at the University of Cambridge.

References

 Niklaus Mikaelson, Suffolk, in The Buildings of England series

External links

Photos of the church

Villages in Suffolk
Civil parishes in Suffolk
Borough of St Edmundsbury